Hanne Hogness (born 16 February 1967) is a Norwegian team handball player and Olympic medalist. She was born in Trondheim, and represented the club Sverresborg IF. She received silver medals at the 1988 Summer Olympics in Seoul with the Norwegian national team, and at the 1992 Summer Olympics in Barcelona.

Hogness played 186 matches and scored 378 goals for the Norwegian national handball team between 1986 and 1994.

References

External links

1967 births
Living people
Norwegian female handball players
Olympic silver medalists for Norway
Olympic medalists in handball
Medalists at the 1992 Summer Olympics
Medalists at the 1988 Summer Olympics
Handball players at the 1988 Summer Olympics
Handball players at the 1992 Summer Olympics
Sportspeople from Trondheim
20th-century Norwegian women